The Windsor Framework is a proposed post-Brexit legal agreement between the European Union and the United Kingdom which was announced on 27 February 2023. It is designed to address the problem of the movement of goods between the European Single Market and the United Kingdom in the current Northern Ireland Protocol.

Overview 
The agreement was named after the meeting of the UK Prime Minister, Rishi Sunak, and the President of the European Commission, Ursula von der Leyen, at the Fairmont hotel at Windsor Great Park.  After meeting the PM and announcing the deal at the Windsor Guildhall, von der Leyen then had tea with King Charles III in Windsor Castle.

The proposed agreement was reached in accordance with Articles 16 and 17 of the protocol and does not formally need parliamentary approval. However, the Prime Minister has promised that MPs shall have an opportunity to vote on it. Its adoption will likely halt the Northern Ireland Protocol Bill and the infringement procedures by the European Commission brought against the UK in relation to the bill.

On the EU side, the agreement will have to pass with a qualified majority in the Council of the European Union. Some parts of the agreement will have to obtain the consent of the European Parliament.

Contents of the agreement 
The proposed agreement relates to goods crossing the Irish Sea from Great Britain to Northern Ireland. It would introduce green and red lanes to reduce checks and paperwork on goods that are destined for Northern Ireland, and separate them from goods at risk of moving into the EU Common Market. It also includes a number of agreements on medicine control, VAT and alcohol duty.

Stormont brake 
The framework introduces a mechanism called the "Stormont brake", which would allow the Northern Ireland Assembly to temporarily stop any changes to EU goods regulations from applying in Northern Ireland if the Assembly feared that the changes would have a "significant and lasting effects on everyday lives". 

According to the agreement, the Northern Ireland Assembly can trigger the brake on any new "significantly different" rule implemented if 30 Members of the Legislative Assembly from two or more parties object, giving way to a 14-day consultation period before reference to the UK Government for consideration. Cross-community consent (support from both unionists and nationalists) is not required. However, "the government says a decision on whether to permanently block an EU rule, once suspended and following discussion in the Joint Committee, would not happen 'in the absence of a cross-community vote'".

Reactions

Ireland 
An Taoiseach Leo Varadkar welcomed the agreement and said: "The Irish Government will do all we can to make these new arrangements work in the interest of people and enterprises in Northern Ireland, here in the Republic of Ireland while protecting the European Single Market and the Common Travel Area between Ireland and the United Kingdom and the Good Friday Agreement." Sinn Féin president Mary Lou McDonald indicated her support for the agreement.

Northern Ireland 
Democratic Unionist Party leader Jeffrey Donaldson's initial reaction to the agreement was one in which he said progress was made in several areas with several obstacles outstanding, adding that the framework would have to hold up to the party's seven tests on a suitable replacement to the Northern Ireland Protocol. Sammy Wilson expressed scepticism toward the Stormont brake, saying that "[DUP MPs] still fear our position in the United Kingdom is not going to be restored". On 20 March 2023, Donaldson announced that the DUP would oppose the framework, with the party and other unionists arguing that the agreement would continue to require Northern Ireland to comply with EU law.

Vice President of Sinn Féin Michelle O'Neill said "I rarely find myself agreeing with a British prime minister but access to both markets has to be grabbed with both hands".

Alliance Party deputy leader Stephen Farry and Social Democratic and Labour Party leader Colum Eastwood both expressed concerns about the Stormont Brake and the need for dual access to the UK and European markets.

United Kingdom 
On 2 March 2023, former prime minister Boris Johnson said it will be "very difficult" for him to vote for the Windsor Framework. Johnson said the deal was "not about the UK taking back control".

International 
US President Joe Biden called the framework an "essential step to ensuring that the hard-earned peace and progress of the Belfast/Good Friday Agreement is preserved and strengthened".

See also
 Brexit withdrawal agreement

References

External links 
 Official website (UK)Contains political and legal documents 
 
 

Brexit-related agreements
2023 in British politics
2023 in the European Union
2023 in Northern Ireland
February 2023 events in the United Kingdom
Rishi Sunak
Windsor, Berkshire